Isla de Cañas  is a corregimiento in Tonosí District, Los Santos Province, Panama with a population of 397 as of 2010. It was created by Law 61 of October 18, 2003.

Image gallery

References

Corregimientos of Los Santos Province